The SlipStream Genesis is a family of American, strut-braced, high wing, pusher configuration, tricycle gear aircraft, produced in kit form, for amateur construction. Designed by Chuck Hamilton, the series were originally produced by Innovation Engineering of Davenport, Iowa and more recently by SlipStream International of Wautoma, Wisconsin.

Design and development
Developed in 1991 for the homebuilt aircraft market, the Genesis is built from aluminium tubing, riveted together using stainless steel gussets for support. The tail surfaces are suspended from a distinctive series of four tubes that curve to allow clearance for the pusher propeller. The wings and tail surfaces are covered with doped aircraft fabric or optionally with pre-sewn Dacron sailcloth envelopes.

The series is unusual in having control yokes in place of the more common control sticks used on this class of aircraft.

The Genesis can be fitted with floats or skis. Options include larger fuel capacity, electrically-operated flaperons and trim, wheel pants and ballistic parachute.

Variants
Genesis
Initial two-seat model for the homebuilt market. First flown in 1992. 200 were reported completed by 2011 and the type remains in production.
Genesis XL
Two-seat model for the homebuilt market with wider chord wing.
Revelation
Two-seat ultralight trainer. Structurally identical to the Genesis, but with a simplified semi-enclosed cockpit, no doors and a longer  wingspan. Standard engine is the  Rotax 503, with other engines up to  optional, including the  Rotax 582,  Rotax 912UL,  Rotax 912ULS,  Rotax 914 and the  Verner 133M. Some examples have also used the  Subaru EA-81 engine. 150 were reported completed by 2011 and the type remains in production.
Skyblaster
Two-seat, twin engined model for the homebuilt market, powered by two  Rotax 503 engines, mounted in push-pull configuration. Four reported built by 2001, the model is no longer in production.
SkyQuest
Two-seat, twin engined model for the homebuilt market, powered by two  Rotax 503 engines, mounted in pusher configuration, with the second engine mounted above the cabin. First flown in 1996, seven were reported as completed in 2003, it is no longer in production.
Scepter
Single-seat, single- engined model for the homebuilt market, powered by a standard  Rotax 447 engine, mounted in pusher configuration. Other engines used include the  Rotax 503 and  Zanzottera MZ 201. Twenty were reported completed by 2004, the type is no longer in production.
Ultra Sport
Two-seat development of the Revelation for the US light-sport aircraft market, powered by a standard  HKS 700E engine. Four had been completed and flown by 2011.

Specifications (Revelation)

See also

References

External links

Homebuilt aircraft
Light-sport aircraft